Vapnagård is a large housing project in Helsingør, Denmark. Approx. 4000 people live in the 57 concrete blocks. Each block has either 3 or 4 floors.

References

Apartment buildings in Denmark
Helsingør
Buildings and structures in Helsingør Municipality